Mariana Cerro Galán (born 22 May 2000) is a Spanish footballer who plays as a midfielder for Athletic Club.

Club career
Cerro started her career at Ardoi. On 4 April 2021, she made her Primera División debut for Athletic Club, coming on as a substitute for Yulema Corres against Santa Teresa. Cerro became the first Athletic Club B player to debut for the first team under Iraia Iturregi's management and was praised for her performance.

References

External links
 
 
 
 

2000 births
Living people
Women's association football midfielders
Spanish women's footballers
Footballers from Navarre
Athletic Club Femenino players
Primera División (women) players
Segunda Federación (women) players
People from Cuenca de Pamplona
Athletic Club Femenino B players
CA Osasuna Femenino players
21st-century Spanish women